Libia may refer to:
Libya, the country, as a misspelling or in Italian and other languages
Particularly during the Italian period
Libia (Rome Metro), underground station
, named for the Italian colony